The following lists events that happened during 1995 in Rwanda.

Incumbents 
 President: Pasteur Bizimungu 
 Prime Minister: Faustin Twagiramungu (until 31 August), Pierre-Célestin Rwigema (starting 31 August)

References

 
1990s in Rwanda
Years of the 20th century in Rwanda
Rwanda
Rwanda